Malea Louise Engesser Cesar (born December 9, 2003) is a footballer who plays as a defender for Blacktown City. Born in the United States, she represents the Philippines women's national team.

International career
Cesar was born in the United States to a Filipino father and American mother. She was part of the Philippines team for the 2022 AFC Women's Asian Cup qualifiers but never appeared in a game. Cesar was also part of the squad which participated in the 2022 AFC Women's Asian Cup in India. She made her senior national team debut in the Philippines' 1–0 win against Thailand. She scored her first international goal during stoppage time in the Philippines' 6–0 win against Indonesia.

International goals
Scores and results list the Philippines' goal tally first.

Honours

International

Philippines
Southeast Asian Games third place: 2021
AFF Women's Championship: 2022

References

2003 births
Living people
Sportspeople from Newport Beach, California
Soccer players from California
Filipino women's footballers
Philippines women's international footballers
American women's soccer players
American sportspeople of Filipino descent
Citizens of the Philippines through descent
Women's association football defenders
Southeast Asian Games bronze medalists for the Philippines
Southeast Asian Games medalists in football
Competitors at the 2021 Southeast Asian Games